Jesús Rico can refer to:

 Jesús Rico (footballer) (born 1953), Mexican footballer
 Jesús Rico (sprinter) (born 1950), Venezuelan sprinter